The Khrami, in its upper course Ktsia, is a river in eastern Georgia and western Azerbaijan, a right tributary of the Kura (Mtkvari). It originates in the Trialeti Range and flows into a deep valley. It is fed primarily by snow. Its main tributaries are the Debed and Mashavera. The Tsalka Reservoir and three hydroelectric power plants are built on the Khrami.

See also 
Samshvilde Canyon Natural Monument

References 

Rivers of Georgia (country)
Rivers of Azerbaijan
International rivers of Asia
International rivers of Europe